In Turkey, time is given by UTC+03:00 year-round. This time is also called Turkey Time (TRT). The time at most is the same as in the Moscow Time and Arabia Standard Time zones. TRT was adopted by the Turkish Government on 8 September 2016. It was also in use in the Turkish Republic of Northern Cyprus until it reverted to Eastern European Time (EET) in October 2017.

During some seasons the TRT is also on the same time as Eastern European Time. The IANA time zone identifier for Turkey is Europe/Istanbul.

History
Until 1927, "Turkish time" (or alla turca time or ezânî time) referred to the system of setting the clocks to 12:00 midnight at sunset. This necessitated adjusting the clocks daily, although tower clocks were only reset two or three times a week, and the precise time varied from one location to another depending on latitude and longitude.

The day was divided into two 12-hour periods, with the second 12:00 occurring at a "theoretical sunrise." In practice, the Turkish railroads used both Turkish time (for public schedules) and eastern European time (for actually scheduling the trains), and government telegraph lines used St. Sophia time (i.e., Paris time + 1:47:32) for international telegrams.

Until 2016, Turkey used Eastern European Time (EET) in the winter (UTC+02:00) and Eastern European Summer Time (EEST) (UTC+03:00) during the summer. The date for transition between standard time and daylight saving time generally followed EU rules, but had variations in some years.

In 2016, the decision to stay on UTC+03:00 year-round was enacted. However, in October 2017, the Turkish government announced that starting 28 October 2018, the country would revert to EET, but this sudden decision was reversed in November 2017. In October 2018, a presidential decree announced that the UTC+03:00 would remain the year-round permanent time zone for the country.

Today, during summers TRT time is the same as with the EET, while an hour ahead of EET in Winter and other the partial half of other seasons.

Controversy

The time change made caused many criticisms and controversy, within the public and specially media which continues on to this day. Though some critics argue that this change saves money, most argue that the change actually rather causes waste. It is also among the criticisms that the change creates psychological and security problems, specially during school entry hours for students, and benefits only electricity companies.

See also 
 Daylight saving time in Turkey

References